The Best of ZZ Top (10 Legendary Texas Tales) is a greatest hits album by American rock band ZZ Top, released November 26, 1977. Spanning the years from 1971 to 1975, this compilation album does not contain any songs from Tejas, which was released the year before.

Track listing

Personnel 
 Billy Gibbons – guitar, vocals
 Dusty Hill – bass, backing vocals, lead vocal on "Tush", co-lead vocals on "Beer Drinkers and Hell Raisers" and "Heard It on the X"
 Frank Beard – drums, percussion

Charts

Certifications

References 

1977 greatest hits albums
Albums produced by Bill Ham
ZZ Top compilation albums
London Records compilation albums